Zalim Zaurbiyevich Kishev (born 18 July 1990) is a Russian football defender.

Club career
He made his debut in the Russian Second Division for FC Angusht Nazran on 17 April 2011 in a game against FC Kavkaztransgaz-2005 Ryzdvyany. He made his Russian Football National League debut for Angusht on 7 July 2013 in a game against FC Neftekhimik Nizhnekamsk.

References

External links
 

1990 births
Sportspeople from Nalchik
Living people
Russian footballers
Association football defenders
PFC Spartak Nalchik players
FC Angusht Nazran players
FC Inter Cherkessk players
FC Mashuk-KMV Pyatigorsk players